Darryl Damone Johnson (born October 26, 1965) is an American former professional basketball player. Born in Flint, Michigan, Johnson attended Michigan State University. He was selected with the 12th overall pick in the third round (58th overall) of the 1987 NBA draft by the Golden State Warriors, but never played for them. He spent most of the early part of his career playing in the Continental Basketball Association and the World Basketball League before ending his career playing in South America. Johnson also played 11 games for the Cleveland Cavaliers during the 1995–96 NBA season, averaging 1.1 points per game.

Johnson grew up playing at Jackson Park on the north side of Flint, Michigan. He later enjoyed a successful four-year run (1983–87) at Michigan State University, followed by a solid professional career in the CBA and overseas, as well as brief NBA stints with the Indiana Pacers (1990 training camp) and Cleveland Cavaliers.

References

External links

ACB.com profile 
Townsville Suns stats
Blog entry
Article links –      

1965 births
Living people
African-American basketball players
American expatriate basketball people in the Philippines
American expatriate basketball people in Spain
American men's basketball players
Basketball players from Flint, Michigan
CB Girona players
Cedar Rapids Silver Bullets players
Cleveland Cavaliers players
Flint Fuze players
Golden State Warriors draft picks
Idaho Stampede (CBA) players
Liga ACB players
Michigan State Spartans men's basketball players
Omaha Racers players
Point guards
Rockford Lightning players
Magnolia Hotshots players
Philippine Basketball Association imports
21st-century African-American people
20th-century African-American sportspeople